"Down Will Come" is the fourth episode of the second season of the American anthology crime drama television series True Detective. It is the 12th overall episode of the series and was written by series creator Nic Pizzolatto and Scott Lasser, and directed by Jeremy Podeswa. It was first broadcast on HBO in the United States on July 12, 2015.

The season is set in California, and focuses on three detectives, Ray Velcoro (Colin Farrell), Ani Bezzerides (Rachel McAdams) and Paul Woodrugh (Taylor Kitsch), from three cooperating police departments and a criminal-turned-businessman named Frank Semyon (Vince Vaughn) as they investigate a series of crimes they believe are linked to the murder of a corrupt politician. In the episode, Velcoro, Bezzerides and Woodrugh find a possible connection to Caspere's murder and lead a raid for answers. Meanwhile, Semyon starts to rebuild his empire.

According to Nielsen Media Research, the episode was seen by an estimated 2.36 million household viewers and gained a 1.1 ratings share among adults aged 18–49. The episode received mixed reviews from critics; while critics praised the climatic shootout sequence, others found it jarring on the tone of the series, as well as criticizing the writing, lack of character development and pacing.

Plot
Velcoro (Colin Farrell) and Bezzerides (Rachel McAdams) send the burnt Cadillac to a shop for repair. Meanwhile, Woodrugh (Taylor Kitsch) finds that he spent the night with Miguel (Gabriel Luna) and leaves the apartment. He sees that his motorcycle has been stolen and is also harassed by reporters regarding Lacey Lindel's incident.

Semyon (Vince Vaughn) starts rebuilding his criminal empire by contacting old properties he owned, as well as starting business with local drug suppliers. Velcoro and Bezzerides ask Chessani's daughter Betty (Emily Rios) about Caspere, to which she says that her life was depressive when her mother killed herself while being a patient of Dr. Pitlor (Rick Springfield). After visiting Eliot (David Morse), Velcoro and Bezzerides are led to vast tracts of land contaminated by the heavy metals dumped in the tailings from decades of mining, prompting Velcoro to admit that the State investigation into Vinci is little more than a shakedown.

Woodrugh talks with Emily (Adria Arjona) to talk about his problems and is surprised when she reveals she is pregnant. Woodrugh suggests they should marry, proclaiming his love for her. Bezzerides is suspended from her workplace after a colleague files a sexual harassment complaint but she will still be allowed to work in the task force for the case. She returns to the team's office, to find that Velcoro, Woodrugh and Dixon (W. Earl Brown) assembled a bigger team for help as they are pressured to close the case. They have managed to investigate into a local pimp, Ledo Amarilla (Cesar Garcia), who had a prostitute take some of Caspere's stuff and plan on leading a raid on Amarilla's home. The day before the raid, Velcoro visits Chad (Trevor Larcom) to give him his father's old police badge.

Velcoro, Bezzerides, Woodrugh and the task force reunite outside Amarilla's warehouse. However, they are seen by Amarilla's henchmen and a gunfight ensues. During the shootout, the bullets hit the building, which is revealed to be a meth lab, causing a massive explosion. In the chaos, many police officers are killed, including Dixon. Bezzerides then enters the building to catch Amarilla, who escapes in a SUV. The SUV runs over many civilians and then crashes a bus. Amarilla and his gang leave the SUV to start another shootout, killing civilians. Velcoro, Woodrugh and Bezzerides close in the gang and manage to kill most of them. Amarilla then holds a hostage at gunpoint and then executes the hostage, prompting Velcoro and Woodrugh to gun him down. Velcoro, Bezzerides and Woodrugh then stare in horror at the amount of police officers, gangbangers and civilians killed just as more police units arrive.

Production

Development
In June 2015, the episode's title was revealed as "Down Will Come" and it was announced that series creator Nic Pizzolatto and Scott Lasser had written the episode while Jeremy Podeswa had directed it. This was Pizzolatto's twelfth writing credit, Lasser's first writing credit, and Podeswa's first directing credit.

Reception

Viewers
The episode was watched by 2.36 million viewers, earning a 1.1 in the 18-49 rating demographics on the Nielson ratings scale. This means that 1.1 percent of all households with televisions watched the episode. This was a 10% decrease from the previous episode, which was watched by 2.62 million viewers with a 1.1 in the 18-49 demographics.

Critical reviews
"Down Will Come" received mixed reviews from critics. The review aggregator website Rotten Tomatoes reported a 54% approval rating for the episode, based on 26 reviews, with an average rating of 6.83/10. The site's consensus states: "Though the final scene of True Detectives 'Down Will Come' was spectacular, the events hardly felt earned after a brooding, clunky hour of storytelling."

Roth Cornet of IGN gave the episode a "good" 7.5 out of 10 and wrote in her verdict, "At the mid-way point, True Detective has become far more a series about legacy and paying for past sins than a crime drama set in a gritty real-world setting."

Erik Adams of The A.V. Club gave the episode a "B-" grade and wrote, "The amount of fire they draw at the end of the episode suggests that they're either getting too close to the truth, or they were set up by someone trying to protect the truth. The retaliatory assault sends a message, loud and clear — like an SUV slamming into a city bus, the sounds of 'Whoa, cool!' and 'Whoa, really?' resounding through the streets." 

Alan Sepinwall of HitFix wrote, "The one potential bonus of the insane level of that shootout is that it almost certainly has to blow up the structure of the show as it's been struggling to work so far. Whether or not any of the survivors actually lose their jobs over this, it's hard to imagine the task force staying in place, and I'm expecting some kind of notable change in the status quo. Of course, the first season grew a little weaker as we began jumping through time (and as Rust and Marty stopped narrating the action), but we can hope for the inverse of that. Maybe." Gwilym Mumford of The Guardian wrote, "At the halfway point of this disappointing second season, so much remains a blur – to paraphrase Frank Semyon, someone needs to hit the warp drive." Ben Travers of IndieWire gave the episode a "B" grade and wrote, "Now halfway through Season 2, an enticing ending seems far more likely than it did two episodes prior, and that's in part due to the balance between character study and cop drama he's found in recent weeks. We're equally engaged with each element right now, and there are still plenty of possibilities for what's next in both stories. As for now, I'll happily take a little action paired with a lot of plot advancement before looking forward to what comes next."

Jeff Jensen of Entertainment Weekly wrote, "The show's fourth hour fails to connect, despite ending with a blood-pumping shoot-out." Aaron Riccio of Slant Magazine wrote, "Good and evil have often been described as two sides of the coin that is humanity, and 'Down Will Come' certainly puts that theory into practice. As the title's play on words suggests, evil things are all but guaranteed to fall upon us, as cyclical as the physical forces that bring dawn (or light) to each new day." 

Kenny Herzog of Vulture gave the episode a 3 star rating out of 5 and wrote, "Who these people are, where they come from, what they want it to mean, and what they want for the future — it's all on the line now. It's gut-check time, which is when True Detective is at its best." Tony Sokol of Den of Geek gave the episode a 4 star rating out of 5 and wrote, "The labored post-traumatic stressed breathing of Ani Bezzerides, Detective Ray Velcoro and Officer Paul Woodrough at the end of tonight's episode is their minds getting around the idea that they sidestepped a steamroller that they set in motion that caused an unexplainable amount of collateral damage." 

TV Fanatic gave the episode a 4.2 star rating out of 5 and wrote, "We had to wade through a lot of emotional angst, dark looks and procedural plot points before getting to the explosive last few minutes of 'Down Will Come'. I'd say it was worth it." Shane Ryan of Paste gave the episode a 8.5 out of 10 and wrote, "The special feeling many of us associate with season one came about because of the controlled way the entire True Detective team deployed philosophy. They reined in the writer's worst impulses, and the impact, when it came, was precise and devastating. This time, left to his own devices and with the kind of individual mandate you rarely see in television, Pizzolatto has made use of his full philosophical arsenal. It's still effective when it hits, but too often, it works like a grenade that he drops at his own feet."

References

External links
 "Down Will Come" at HBO
 

2015 American television episodes
Television episodes directed by Jeremy Podeswa
Television episodes written by Nic Pizzolatto
True Detective episodes